Guanyun County is under the administration of Lianyungang, Jiangsu province, China. It borders the prefecture-level city of Suqian to the southwest and the Yellow Sea to the east.

Toponymy

History 
The area of present-day Guanyun County was a major salt-making site for the Qing dynasty.

The county was formally established in April 1912.

Geography

It borders Guannan County), Xiangshui County, Lianshui County, and Shuyang County.

The  flows through the county eastwards into the East China Sea.

Climate 
Guanyun is situated in the north of Jiangsu Plain and has an oceanic monsoon climate, with distinct four seasons, like most of its neighbors. The annual average temperature is close its neighbors 15 °C, with 25 °C in summers and 5 °C in winters. Average rainfall is close to 1,000 m annually.

Administration
Guanyun County is under the jurisdiction of prefecture-level city of Lianyungang. The county comprises 1 subdistrict, 12 towns, and 4 other township-level divisions. These administer 27 residential communities and 302 administrative villages.

Subdistricts 

Towns 

Other township-level divisions 
Guanyun County also administers 4 other areas with township-level status: Wutuhe Farm, Guanxi Saltworks, Guanyun Economic Development Zone, and Guanyun Lingang Industrial Zone.

Demographics 
The county has an estimated population of 1,026,000 in 2020, up from the 817,509 recorded in the 2010 Chinese Census. The county's population in the 2000 Chinese Census was 1,030,069, and a 1996 estimate of the county's population totaled 965,000.

Economy

As of 2020, Guanyun County has gross domestic product of ¥38.164 billion, and an industrial output totaling ¥8.93 billion. The county's urban residents and rural residents had average annual per capita disposable incomes of ¥30,329.6 and ¥17,958.7, respectively.

Guanyun County also contributes to 60% of China's annual lingerie production.

Agriculture 
Guanyun County traditionally depended on its agricultural and fishery sectors. Currently, the county produces significant amounts of grain and fungi, and raises a significant amount of hogs.

Service industry 
As of 2020, the value of the county's service industry totaled ¥17 billion.

Over years, a few of industrial sectors have been added to the county's economy, including navigation, waterway transportation industries.

Transportation
Lianyungang Huaguoshan International Airport is located in Guanyun County and will open on December 2, 2021.

Guanyun is connected to the rest of Jiangsu Prevince by four expressways (Nanjing-Lianyungang, Feng-Guanyun, Lianyungang-Xuzhou and Lianyungang-Yancheng expressways) and four highway (G204, G236, G324 and G242). Within its boundary, a river network provides the county with cheap and convenient transportation.

In the inner city, the public transportation including bus, taxi and cargo transport, charted buses to near cities or towns, provides convenience to commuters even if the system still needs a major improvement.

Education

Guanyun has instituted a compulsory primary education system, and multiple secondary schools. There are no higher learning institutions in the county.

Tourism 
Guanyun County is home to a number of ecotourist sites, including Kaishan Island Scenic Region, Dayishan Mountain Scenic Region, and more.

References

County-level divisions of Jiangsu
Lianyungang